Mami Sasazaki (笹崎まみ), born May 21, 1990, in Aichi Prefecture, Japan), known for both her full name or by her stage name MAMI, is a Japanese musician, singer and songwriter. She serves as the lead guitarist and a backup vocalist of the Japanese rock band Scandal. She often amazes fans that come to see them live with her dexterity and skill with the electric guitar. She also appears serious and kind of dark on stage due to her long fringe and serious expression, but offstage, she becomes a direct opposite, displaying a very cheerful and upbeat personality. Also among the group, she's also the biggest fan of Japanese Anime. In the vocals department, she has a very 'soft-punkish' voice.

Early life 
Mami was enrolled at Caless, a voice and dance school in Osaka, where she and her future bandmates met. Before becoming a musician, she appeared along with her future bandmate Tomomi Ogawa and singer Yuya Matsushita in a TV commercial.

References

Musicians from Aichi Prefecture
Japanese rock guitarists
Sony Music Entertainment Japan artists
1990 births

Living people
Japanese women rock singers